The Featherweight class in the boxing competition was the fourth-lowest weight class.  Featherweights were limited to those boxers weighing a maximum of 57 kilograms (125.7 lbs). 32 boxers qualified for this category. Like all Olympic boxing events, the competition was a straight single-elimination tournament. Both semifinal losers were awarded bronze medals, so no boxers competed again after their first loss. Bouts consisted of six rounds each. Five judges scored each bout.

Medalists

Robinson was controversially disqualified for alleged head-butting in the gold medal bout, and did not receive his silver medal. After a successful protest by American officials, Robinson was awarded silver.

Schedule

Draw

References

Boxing at the 1968 Summer Olympics